Dypsis pilulifera is a species of flowering plant in the family Arecaceae. It is found only in Madagascar. It is threatened by habitat loss.

References

pilulifera
Endemic flora of Madagascar
Vulnerable plants
Taxa named by Odoardo Beccari
Taxonomy articles created by Polbot